The 1969 Washington Star International was a men's tennis tournament and was played on outdoor green clay courts at the Rock Creek Park in Washington, D.C. It was the inaugural edition of the tournament and was held from July 8 through July 14, 1969. Unseeded Thomaz Koch won the singles title and earned a $5,000 first prize.

Finals

Singles
 Thomaz Koch defeated  Arthur Ashe 7–5, 9–7, 4–6, 2–6, 6–4

Doubles
 Patricio Cornejo/  Jaime Fillol defeated  Robert Lutz /  Stan Smith 4–6, 6–1, 6–4

References

External links
 ATP tournament profile

Washington Open (tennis)
Washington Star International
Washington Star International
Washington Star International
Tennis tournaments in Washington, D.C.